Abigail Haight Huntsman (born May 1, 1986) is an American journalist and television personality. The daughter of former Utah Governor Jon Huntsman Jr. and Mary Kaye Huntsman, Huntsman rose to prominence as a host on MSNBC and NBC News. She then became a general assignment reporter for Fox News Channel and later a co-host of Fox & Friends Weekend. Huntsman co-hosted the ABC talk show The View from September 2018 to January 2020.

Early life
Abigail Haight Huntsman was born in Philadelphia, Pennsylvania. She grew up in Utah but spent many years living in Asia, including Taiwan and Singapore. Huntsman graduated from East High School and attended the University of Utah for her freshman year of college while her father was running for governor. She then transferred to the University of Pennsylvania where she graduated in 2008 with a Bachelor of Arts degree in political science and communications.

Career

At age 16, Huntsman worked a behind-the-scenes position at Good Morning America. By her own admission, she disliked it so much that she contemplated giving up on television "forever". While attending the University of Pennsylvania, Huntsman interned for Diane Sawyer. Huntsman, having observed Sawyer's representation of herself and manner of presenting news, became so impressed with her that she would later say, "I always think of her as someone that I hope I can try to be like."

She later became a host and producer for HuffPost Live, the Huffington Posts streaming network. She had also been a frequent guest on CNN.

Huntsman worked on her father's 2012 presidential campaign as a media advisor and surrogate, during which she and her sisters were profiled by The New Yorker, GQ, and BuzzFeed. Huntsman simultaneously appeared as a political commentator for ABC News in Washington, D.C. and Good Morning America in New York City. In October 2012, Huntsman was profiled in ABC News's "Five Questions", a part of This Week with George Stephanopoulos. In August 2012, she was interviewed by Brian Williams on Rock Center about Mitt Romney's run for president and her own relationship with the Mormon faith. Previously, she held a position at the international public relations firm Burson-Marsteller.

In 2013, she was listed as number 26 on the Forbes 30 under 30 list of up and coming members of the media.

In July 2013, Huntsman joined MSNBC's The Cycle, filling a vacancy created by the departure of S.E. Cupp. Huntsman was the second replacement host to join the show, after Ari Melber. She sought to bring conservative views to the program, also denying that her relation to the Huntsman family had anything to do with her acquiring the position since she, in her own words, "went through the same audition process as everybody else", against a field she recalled featuring hundreds of candidates. MSNBC canceled The Cycle in July 2015, and as a result, Huntsman left the network.

In October 2015, Huntsman joined Fox News Channel as a general assignment reporter. She covered the news of the day across the network's daytime and primetime programming. She was named the new co-host of Fox & Friends Weekend in December 2016. She made her final appearance as a co-host of the program on August 12, 2018.

Huntsman then joined the long-running ABC talk show The View as a co-host alongside Whoopi Goldberg, Joy Behar, Sunny Hostin, and Meghan McCain, debuting on the 22nd-season premiere on September 4, 2018. She received a Daytime Emmy Award nomination for Outstanding Entertainment Talk Show Host alongside her co-hosts in 2019. Huntsman announced in January 2020 that she was departing The View after two seasons to become a senior advisor to her father's 2020 Utah gubernatorial election campaign; she made her final appearance as a co-host on the January 17 episode. Her father lost Utah's 2020 Republican gubernatorial primary.

Personal life
Huntsman married her college boyfriend, Jeffrey Bruce Livingston, in 2010. The couple has three children: two daughters and a son. The family lives in Greenwich, Connecticut.

Huntsman is a Republican. She is no longer an active member of the Church of Jesus Christ of Latter-day Saints. Huntsman, along with Margaret Hoover and her former View co-host Meghan McCain, released an ad in early 2013 in support of gay marriage. "I think it's a generational issue, and I think over time you're going to see more and more Republicans support the freedom to marry. I'm happy and proud of that movement."

References

External links

 

1986 births
Living people
American expatriates in Taiwan
American television reporters and correspondents
American women television journalists
American women television presenters
Former Latter Day Saints
Fox News people
Huntsman family
Journalists from New York (state)
American LGBT rights activists
MSNBC people
New York (state) Republicans
University of Pennsylvania alumni
American television talk show hosts